Middletown is an unincorporated community in Champaign County, in the U.S. state of Ohio.

History
Middletown was laid out in 1833, and named for its inland location between Mingo and Cable.

References

Unincorporated communities in Champaign County, Ohio
Unincorporated communities in Ohio